"She Needs Someone to Hold Her (When She Cries)" is a song written by Raymond Smith, and recorded by American country music artist Conway Twitty.  It was released in November 1972 as the first single from the album She Needs Someone to Hold Her.  The song was Twitty's ninth number one in the U.S. country chart as a solo artist.  It stayed at number one for two weeks and spent 14 weeks in the chart.

Personnel
Conway Twitty — vocals
Joe E. Lewis, The Nashville Sounds — vocals
Harold Bradley — 6-string electric bass guitar
Ray Edenton — acoustic guitar
John Hughey — steel guitar
Tommy Markham — drums
Grady Martin — electric guitar
Bob Moore — bass
Hargus "Pig" Robbins — piano

Chart performance

References

1972 singles
1972 songs
Conway Twitty songs
Song recordings produced by Owen Bradley
Decca Records singles